The Utah–Idaho League was a minor league baseball organization founded in 1926. Playing as a six–team,  Class C level league for its duration, the Utah–Idaho League franchises were based exclusively in Idaho and Utah as the name indicates.

History
Fred M. Nye served as president of the Utah–Idaho League for its duration. The Pacific Coast League used the Utah-Idaho for player development. Travel costs in the mountainous territory plagued the league and it permanently folded following the 1928 season. Baseball Hall of Fame members Lefty Gomez, 1928 Salt Lake City Bees and Ernie Lombardi, 1927 Ogden Gunners played in the Utah–Idaho League.

1926–1928 Utah–Idaho League teams

Standings & statistics
1926 Utah–Idaho League
No playoffs scheduled.

1927 Utah–Idaho League
Playoff: Idaho Falls 4 games, Pocatello 3.

1928 Utah–Idaho League
Twin Falls & Idaho Falls disbanded July 5Playoff: Salt Lake City 4 games, Boise 1.

Sources
The Encyclopedia of Minor League Baseball, Second Edition.

References

Defunct minor baseball leagues in the United States
Baseball in Utah
Baseball in Idaho
Baseball leagues in Utah
Baseball leagues in Idaho
Sports leagues established in 1926
Sports leagues disestablished in 1928